Armel Don Akla-Esso Tchilao (born 20 August 1996) is a Beninese footballer who last played for San Diego 1904 FC in the National Independent Soccer Association.

Career

College and amateur
Tchilao spent his entire college career at Oregon State University between 2015 and 2018.

Tchilao also played for Premier Development League sides San Diego Zest in 2017 and Portland Timbers U23s in 2018.

Professional
On January 11, 2019, Tchilao was selected in the second round (36th overall) of the 2019 MLS SuperDraft by LA Galaxy. He signed with LA Galaxy's USL Championship side LA Galaxy II on March 7, 2019.

Tchilao appeared for LA Galaxy's first-team on July 23, 2019, during a 2019 Leagues Cup fixture against Club Tijuana.

In February 2020, Tchilao was signed by San Diego 1904 FC of the National Independent Soccer Association.

References

External links

1996 births
Living people
Association football midfielders
Beninese footballers
LA Galaxy draft picks
LA Galaxy II players
LA Galaxy players
Oregon State Beavers men's soccer players
Portland Timbers U23s players
San Diego Zest players
Soccer players from Arizona
USL Championship players
USL League Two players
National Independent Soccer Association players